The longest rivers of the United States include 38 that have main stems of at least  long. The main stem is "the primary downstream segment of a river, as contrasted to its tributaries". The United States Geological Survey (USGS) defines a main-stem segment by listing coordinates for its two end points, called the source and the mouth. Some well-known rivers like the Atchafalaya, Willamette, and Susquehanna are not included in this list because their main stems are shorter than 500 miles.

Seven rivers in this list cross or form international boundaries. Two—the Yukon and Columbia rivers—begin in Canada and flow into the United States. Three—the Milk and Saint Lawrence rivers and the Red River of the North—begin in the United States and flow into Canada. Of these, only the Milk River crosses the international border twice, leaving and then re-entering the United States. Two rivers, the Colorado and the Rio Grande, begin in the United States and flow into or form a border with Mexico. In addition, the drainage basins of the Mississippi and Missouri rivers extend into Canada, and the basin of the Gila River extends into Mexico.

Sources report hydrological quantities with varied precision. Biologist and author Ruth Patrick, describing a table of high-discharge U.S. rivers, wrote that data on discharge, drainage area, and length varied widely among authors whose works she consulted. "It seems," she said, "that the wisest course is to regard data tables such as the present one as showing the general ranks of rivers, and not to place too much importance on minor (10–20%) differences in figures."

Table
The primary source for watershed and discharge data in the table below is Rivers of North America. Conflicting data from other sources, if the difference is greater than 10 percent, is reported in the notes. Discharge refers to the flow at the mouth. In the "States, provinces, and image" column, the superscripts "s" and "m" indicate "source" and "mouth". Non-U.S. states appear in italics. Except in the "States, provinces, and image" column, abbreviations are as follows: "km" for "kilometer", "mi" for "mile", "s" for "second", "m" for "meter", and "ft" for "foot".

Map

See also 
 List of longest rivers in the United States by state
List of longest streams of Idaho
List of longest streams of Minnesota
List of longest streams of Oregon
 List of rivers by length

Notes

References

Works cited
 
 

United States
Lists of rivers of the United States
Rivers